Grand Champion (also released as Buddy's World in Germany) is a 2002 family film, starring Jacob Fisher, George Strait, Emma Roberts, and Joey Lauren Adams, about a young boy who wants his calf "Hokey" to grow up to be the Grand Champion. George Strait does the "Hokey Pokey" in it. Many other country stars appear in it, as well as actors such as Bruce Willis and Julia Roberts.

References

External links

2000s American films
2000s English-language films
2002 films
American children's films